Hussein Bin Ali Stadium is an association football stadium in Hebron.

West Bank Premier League
The stadium is home to Ahli Al-Khaleel, Shabab Al-Khalil SC and Shabab Alsamu in the West Bank Premier League. Playing for Shabab, Palestine national football team player Ashraf Nu'man scored two goals at the venue against Thaqafi Tulkarem in the 2016–17 season.

Palestine Cup
The 2015 Palestine Cup final between Ahli Al-Khaleel and Ittihad Shujaiyah took place at the stadium - the first final to be contested by the top teams from the West Bank Premier League and Gaza Strip League in 15 years. The intervention of FIFA, UEFA and the AFC was necessary to secure permission from Israeli authorities for players to travel from the Gaza Strip to the West Bank. The match was attended by President of the Palestinian Football Association Jibril Rajoub, MK Ahmad Tibi and the mayors of Bethlehem and Hebron, and sponsored by the Bank of Palestine.

The stadium was again the venue for the 2016 cup final, won by Ahli Al-Khaleel against Shabab Khan Yunis.

References

National stadiums
Sport in the West Bank
Football venues in the State of Palestine
Sports venues completed in 1940
1940 establishments in Mandatory Palestine